Josephat Mule is an  Anglican bishop in Kenya: he is the current Bishop of Kitui.

References

21st-century Anglican bishops of the Anglican Church of Kenya
Anglican bishops of Kitui
Living people
Year of birth missing (living people)